Dobera glabra is an evergreen shrub or tree native to the Somali peninsula, Northeastern Kenya and Ethiopia as well as South Tihamah. In Somali speaking regions its widely known as Garas. In Ethiopia you will find it in Nechisar National Park and along the Sagan River in the Konso special woreda. It is also sparsely distributed in Afar Region where the tree is much appreciated for its fruits.

It is well known to the local Konso people (who call it karsata) for growing new shoots, flowers, and seeds during dry weather. They use it as an indicator of potential famine and drought conditions. D. glabra produces edible fruits and the seed is considered a typical famine food. However, the fruits must be cooked for a long time (i.e. up to 24 hours), they have a bad smell, and excessive consumption causes stomach aches and other intestinal problems.

References

Trees of Ethiopia
Salvadoraceae
Edible plants
Drought-tolerant trees

Trees of Kenya
Flora of Somalia